Scaramucci is an Italian surname. Notable people with the surname include:

Anthony Scaramucci (born 1964), American financier, writer, and briefly the Communications Director for Donald Trump
Maurizio Scaramucci (born 1970), Italian footballer

Italian-language surnames